Šiaulėnai is a town near Šiauliai in Lithuania located at .  It is in the Radviliškis district municipality in Šiauliai County. It is the capital of Šiaulėnai elderate.

History
During the 1784 census, Šiaulėnai was located in the Žemaitija (Samogitia) duchy/eldership.

The Jewish population of Šiaulėnai was devastated by the Nazis during World War II.

Historical names

Under Czarist occupation of Lithuania, the city was known in Russian as Шавлан.  It may be listed on historical documents in the United States as Shavlan, Shavlyan, Shavlyany, or Szawlany, Russia.

Attractions
Notable attractions include:

Šiaulėnai Area Museum, located at LT-5137 Radviliškis district

External links
www.JewishGen.org — Siaulenai, Siauliai uezd, Kaunas gubernia, Latitude: 55°41' Longitude: 23°24', now in Lithuania
www.lietuva.lt — Lithuanian settlements

Towns in Lithuania
Towns in Šiauliai County
Shavelsky Uyezd
Holocaust locations in Lithuania